Guanggu may refer to:
Donghu New Technology Development Zone, which is trademarked and self-labeled as "Optics Valley" of China.
Wuhan Optics Valley F.C., a preexisted soccer team of which the authority of the Development Zone was the title sponsor.